A balance transfer is the transfer of (part of) the balance (either of money or credit) in an account to another account, often held at another institution.  It is most commonly used when describing a credit card balance transfer.

How it works 

Balance transfer allows people to move their debts such as credit card balances, student loans, home loan medical bills, car loans to a zero or lower interest rate credit card for a promotional or limited period. The overall amount and the types of balances that can be transferred depends on the credit card as well as credit score. Moreover, balance transfer should be done as per the timings allocated by the credit card company.

While many credit card issuers offer 0% interest balance transfers, it is important to note that some issuers also charge a transfer fee, which could range from 0–5%. As a result, consumers should evaluate the balance transfer interest rate during the promotional period, the length of the promotional period, and the balance transfer fee when deciding on which balance transfer promotion is best.

Types
There can be transfers between two similar types of accounts or different ones. These include:
Credit card accounts
Bank savings accounts
Bank checking accounts
Trading accounts at financial institutions

Transfers are sometimes facilitated by companies trying to recruit new consumers. Sometimes transfers are accompanied by transaction costs paid by the consumer.

See also

Credit card balance transfer

References

Accounting terminology